Metropolitan is a 1935 back-stage drama film interlaced with songs and musical segments from opera.

Directed by Ryszard Bolesławski (credited as Richard Boleslawski), it featured the famous baritone Lawrence Tibbett (in his penultimate movie role), with Virginia Bruce as his leading lady. Tibbett was America's leading baritone and a major star of the New York Metropolitan Opera, where he sang more than 600 times.

Metropolitan was the first distribution for the 20th Century-Fox film studio, which had been newly formed from the merger of Twentieth Century Pictures and Fox Film Corporation.

Plot summary

Cast
 Lawrence Tibbett as Thomas Renwick 
 Virginia Bruce as Anne Merrill 
 Alice Brady as Ghita Galin 
 Cesar Romero as Niki Baroni 
 Thurston Hall as T. Simon Hunter 
 Luis Alberni as Ugo Pizzi 
 George F. Marion as Papa Perontelli 
 Adrian Rosley as Tolentino 
 Christian Rub as Weidel 
 Franklyn Ardell as Marco 
 Etienne Girardot as Nello 
 Jessie Ralph as Charwoman 
 Jane Darwell as Grandma 
 Walter Brennan as Grandpa
 Gladys Earlcott as Wardrobe woman
 Adrian Morris as Electrician

References

External links
 
 
 
 

1935 films
1935 romantic drama films
1930s romantic musical films
American musical drama films
American romantic drama films
American romantic musical films
American black-and-white films
Films directed by Ryszard Bolesławski
Films about opera
20th Century Fox films
Films produced by Darryl F. Zanuck
Twentieth Century Pictures films
1930s American films